1979 Sakharov, provisionally designated , is a stony Vestian asteroid from the inner regions of the asteroid belt, approximately 4.5 kilometers in diameter. It was discovered during the Palomar–Leiden survey in 1960, and named after Russian physicist Andrei Sakharov.

Discovery 

Sakharov was discovered on 24 September 1960, by the Dutch astronomers Ingrid and Cornelis van Houten, on photographic plates taken by Dutch–American astronomer Tom Gehrels at the U.S. Palomar Observatory in California.

Survey designation 

The survey designation "P-L" stands for Palomar–Leiden, named after Palomar Observatory and Leiden Observatory, which collaborated on the fruitful Palomar–Leiden survey in the 1960s. Gehrels used Palomar's Samuel Oschin telescope (also known as the 48-inch Schmidt Telescope), and shipped the photographic plates to Ingrid and Cornelis van Houten at Leiden Observatory where astrometry was carried out. The trio are credited with the discovery of several thousand minor planets.

Orbit and classification 

Sakharov is a member of the Vesta family, which is named after the main-belt's second-largest body, 4 Vesta. It orbits the Sun in the inner main-belt at a distance of 2.1–2.6 AU once every 3 years and 8 months (1,337 days). Its orbit has an eccentricity of 0.10 and an inclination of 6° with respect to the ecliptic. The body's observation arc begins with its official discovery observation at Palomar, .

Physical characteristics 

The stony S-type asteroid, has been characterized as a Q-V-type by PanSTARRS photometric survey.

Rotation period 

In 2011 and 2013, a total of four well-defined rotational lightcurves were obtained for this asteroid by astronomers Julian Oey at the Australian Kingsgrove and Leura/ Blue Mountains Observatory and by Petr Pravec at the Czech Ondřejov Observatory. The lightcurve gave a rotation period of 7.520 to 7.589 hours with a brightness variation between 0.12 and 0.22 in magnitude.

Diameter and albedo 

According to the original data from the NEOWISE mission of NASA's Wide-field Infrared Survey Explorer, the asteroid measures 4.8 kilometers in diameter and its surface has an albedo of 0.31, while the Collaborative Asteroid Lightcurve Link agrees with the revised NEOWISE data which gave an albedo of 0.26 and a diameter of 4.5 kilometers with an absolute magnitude of 13.8.

Naming 

This minor planet was named in honour of renowned Russian mathematician and physicist Andrei Sakharov (1921–1989), who received the Nobel Peace Prize in 1975. The official naming citation was published by the Minor Planet Center on 1 August 1981.

Notes

References

External links 
 Asteroid Lightcurve Database (LCDB), query form (info )
 Dictionary of Minor Planet Names, Google books
 Asteroids and comets rotation curves, CdR – Observatoire de Genève, Raoul Behrend
 Discovery Circumstances: Numbered Minor Planets (1)-(5000) – Minor Planet Center
 
 

001979
2006
Discoveries by Cornelis Johannes van Houten
Discoveries by Ingrid van Houten-Groeneveld
Discoveries by Tom Gehrels
Named minor planets
19600924